Crime & Investigation (stylized as Crime + Investigation) is an American pay television channel owned by A&E Networks, a joint venture between the Hearst Communications and the Disney Media Networks division of The Walt Disney Company. The channel also broadcasts internationally.

The network airs mostly off-network reruns of crime dramas such as 24, Nash Bridges, and Hack, and the A&E crime documentary shows SWAT, Uncovered, The First 48, American Justice, The Big House and Vanished With Beth Holloway.

References

External links

Television channels and stations established in 2005
A&E Networks
English-language television stations in the United States
Crime television networks